Yiğit Emre Çeltik (born 7 April 2003) is a Turkish professional footballer who plays as a midfielder for Podbeskidzie Bielsko-Biała.

Career
A youth product of Bucaspor and Altınordu, Çeltik began his senior career with Altınordu in the TFF First League. He transferred to the Dutch club Fortuna Sittard on 27 July 2021. He made his professional debut with Fortuna Sittard in a 3–0 KNVB Cup win over TOP Oss on 27 October 2021.

On 12 February 2022, Çeltik joined Polish I liga side Podbeskidzie Bielsko-Biała on loan until the end of the season, with both an extension and a purchase option. On 8 July 2022, he joined the team on a permanent basis, signing a four-year contract.

International career
Çeltik is a youth product of the Turkey U15s, U16s, U17s, and U19s.

References

External links
 

2003 births
Living people
Footballers from İzmir
Turkish footballers
Association football midfielders
Fortuna Sittard players
Podbeskidzie Bielsko-Biała players
TFF First League players
I liga players
Turkish expatriate footballers
Turkish expatriate sportspeople in the Netherlands
Expatriate footballers in the Netherlands
Turkish expatriate sportspeople in Poland
Expatriate footballers in Poland